Tamashii is a professional wrestling event produced by New Japan Pro-Wrestling (NJPW), a Japan-based professional wrestling promotion. 

 

In late 2022, New Japan Pro-Wrestling expressed interest in promoting the brand in Australasia, particularly in Australia and New Zealand. The Tamashii brand was officially launched in September, with the first event taking place in Christchurch on November 11.

Events

See also

List of New Japan Pro-Wrestling pay-per-view events
Professional wrestling at the Tokyo Dome

References

External links
The official New Japan website

Recurring events established in 2022
2022 establishments in Japan